Mania lunus is a moth of the  family Sematuridae, found in forests of Central and South America, where it occurs from Mexico to Brazil.

References

Sematuridae
Moths described in 1758
Taxa named by Carl Linnaeus